Roelof Johannes Gysbertus 'Ralph' Oelofse (12 November 1926 – 24 October 2001) was a South African footballer who played in England for Chelsea and Watford.

Career statistics

Club

Notes

References

1926 births
2001 deaths
South African soccer players
South African expatriate soccer players
Association football defenders
Berea Park F.C. players
Chelsea F.C. players
Watford F.C. players
South African expatriate sportspeople in England
Expatriate footballers in England